Sanae Abdi (born 7 July 1986) is a German-Moroccan lawyer and politician of the Social Democratic Party (SPD) who has been serving as a Member of the Bundestag for the constituency of Cologne I since the 2021 federal election.  She is the first person born in Morocco to serve in the Bundestag.

Early life and career 
Abdi was born in Morocco and emigrated to Germany at the age of three. She grew up in Lüdenscheid, in the Sauerland region of North Rhine-Westphalia and studied law at University of Marburg, the University of Bonn and the University of Cologne.

From 2018 to 2021, Abdi worked at GIZ in Bonn, where she coordinated projects on sustainable supply chains in the textile industry.

Political career 
She ran for the Bundestag in 2021 in a district that historically supported the Social Democrats, but had been held by the Christian Democrats since the 2013 German federal election.  She defeated the incumbent Karsten Möring for the direct mandate.

In parliament, Abdi has since been serving on the Committee on Climate Protection and Energy, the Committee on Economic Cooperation and Development and the Subcommittee on International Climate and Energy Policy. She is also her parliamentary group’s spokesperson for development policy.

In addition to her committee assignments, Abdi is part of the German Parliamentary Friendship Group for Relations with the Maghreb States.

Within her parliamentary group, Abdi belongs to the Parliamentary Left, a left-wing movement.

Other activities 
 German United Services Trade Union (ver.di), Member

References 

1986 births
Living people
21st-century German politicians
21st-century German women politicians
Politicians from Cologne
German people of Moroccan descent
Moroccan emigrants to Germany
Female members of the Bundestag
Members of the Bundestag for North Rhine-Westphalia
Members of the Bundestag for the Social Democratic Party of Germany
Members of the Bundestag 2021–2025